The 1996 season is the 10th season of the league that began on December 30, 1995, and concluded with the championship game on April 12, 1996.

Team movement
The Charlotte Cobras played their only season in 1996, in the process achieving the only winless season in the history of the league.

Regular season

All Star Game
No All-Star Game was played in 1996.

Playoffs

Awards

Weekly awards
Each week, a player is awarded "Player of the Week" honours.

Monthly awards
An award is also given out monthly for the best overall player.

All-Pro Teams
First Team:
Gary Gait, Philadelphia
Paul Gait, Rochester
Tom Marechek, Philadelphia
John Tavares, Buffalo
Jim Veltman, Buffalo
Dallas Eliuk, Philadelphia (goalie)

Second Team:
Chris Bates, Charlotte
Thomas Carmean, Boston
Chris Driscoll, Rochester
Kevin Finneran, Philadelphia
Duane Jacobs, Rochester
Steve Dietrich, Rochester (goalie)

Statistics leaders
Bold numbers indicate new single-season records. Italics indicate tied single-season records.

See also
 1996 in sports

References
1996 Archive at the Outsider's Guide to the NLL

MILL
Major Indoor Lacrosse League seasons